The Hiro G2H (or Hiro Navy Type 95 Twin-engined Land-based Attacker) was a 1930s Japanese bomber or reconnaissance monoplane designed and built by the Hiro Naval Arsenal for the Imperial Japanese Navy.

Design and development
The Hiro G2H1 was one of the first long-range land-based bomber/reconnaissance aircraft designed and built for the Imperial Japanese Navy. The prototype appeared in 1933 but suffered from structural weakness. The aircraft was a low-wing, cantilever monoplane powered by two 1,180 hp (880 kW) Type 94 piston engines. The aircraft struggled with the unreliability of the engines, and only eight aircraft were built. The development of the aircraft was costly in both manpower and finance and the aircraft did not live up to expectations. The aircraft however did give the Navy experience in the operation of long-range land-based aircraft, which was to prove invaluable in the later Pacific War.

Operational history
One aircraft was lost in an accident but the rest operated against the Chinese mainland during the Second Sino-Japanese War. In 1937, five aircraft were destroyed in a fire at their base on Cheju Island.

Operator

Imperial Japanese Navy Air Service

Specifications (G2H1)

References

Notes

Bibliography

 Mikesh, Robert C. and Shorzoe Abe. Japanese Aircraft, 1910-1941. Annapolis, MD: Naval Institute Press, 1990. .
 

G2H
G2H
Low-wing aircraft
Aircraft first flown in 1933
Twin piston-engined tractor aircraft